Juan Ángel Vera Gómez (born 5 February 1999) is a Paraguayan professional footballer who plays as a midfielder for Chacarita Juniors.

Career
Vera began his senior career in Argentina with Chacarita Juniors, joining the club in 2018. Jorge Vivaldo promoted the midfielder into their first-team squad in the 2018–19 Primera B Nacional campaign, selecting him on the substitutes bench three times for matches with Gimnasia y Esgrima, Temperley and Mitre. However, it was Patricio Pisano - Vivaldo's replacement in January 2019 - who picked Vera for his professional debut on 2 February during a fixture with Deportivo Morón; he played the full duration of a goalless draw.

Career statistics
.

References

External links

1999 births
Living people
Place of birth missing (living people)
Paraguayan footballers
Association football midfielders
Paraguayan expatriate footballers
Expatriate footballers in Argentina
Paraguayan expatriate sportspeople in Argentina
Primera Nacional players
Chacarita Juniors footballers